The Ocean Handicap was an American Thoroughbred horse race held annually at Sheepshead Bay Race Track in Sheepshead Bay, Brooklyn, New York from 1894 thru 1909. A race for horses of either sex age three and older, it was run on dirt over a distance of 1 mile. The Ocean Handicap was the second of the track's autumn serials, coming after the Fall Handicap at 6½ furlongs and before the Omnium Handicap at 1⅛ miles.

The 1904 running of the Ocean Handicap was won by Walter Jennings very good filly Dainty who beat Alan-a-Dale, winner of the 1902 Kentucky Derby.

The final running of the Ocean Handicap was won by King James, owned and trained by future U.S. Racing Hall of Fame inductee Sam Hildreth. King James had not run in the Fall Handicap but went on to earn his second win of the autumn serials with a victory in the Omnium Handicap. His performance for the year would earn him recognition as the American Champion Older Horse of 1909.

Demise of the Ocean Handicap 
After years of uncertainty, on June 11, 1908 the Republican controlled New York Legislature under Governor Charles Evans Hughes passed the Hart–Agnew anti-betting legislation with penalties allowing for fines and up to a year in prison. The owners of Sheepshead Bay Race Track, and other racing facilities in New York State, struggled to stay in business without income from betting. Racetrack operators had no choice but to drastically reduce the purse money being paid out which resulted in the Ocean Handicap offering a purse in 1909 that was one-third of what it had been in earlier years. These small purses made horse racing highly unprofitable and impossible for even the most successful horse owners to continue in business. As such, for the 1910 racing season management of the Sheepshead Bay facility dropped some of its less important stakes races and used the purse money to bolster its most important events. The effect was to place the Ocean Handicap on hiatus. Further restrictive legislation was passed by the New York Legislature in 1910 which deepened the financial crisis for track operators and after a 1911 amendment to the law to limit the liability of owners and directors was defeated, every racetrack in New York State shut down. Owners, whose horses of racing age had nowhere to go, began sending them, their trainers and their jockeys to race in England and France. Many horses ended their racing careers there, and a number remained to become an important part of the European horse breeding industry. Thoroughbred Times reported that  more than 1,500 American horses were sent overseas between 1908 and 1913 and of them at least 24 were either past, present, or future Champions. When a February 21, 1913 ruling by the New York Supreme Court, Appellate Division Court saw horse racing return in 1913 it was too late for the Sheepshead Bay horse racing facility and it never reopened.

Records
Speed record:
 1 mile : 1:37.80 – King James (1909)

Most wins:
 No horse ever won this race more than once

Most wins by a jockey:
 2 – Henry Spencer (1900, 1901)
 2 – Eddie Dugan (1907, 1909)

Most wins by a trainer:
 3 – Walter B. Jennings (1898, 1904, 1905)

Most wins by an owner:
 3 – Walter B. Jennings (1898, 1904, 1905)

Winners

References

Open mile category horse races
Discontinued horse races in New York City
Sheepshead Bay Race Track
Recurring sporting events established in 1894
Recurring sporting events disestablished in 1909
1894 establishments in New York (state)
1909 disestablishments in New York (state)